Ray is a 2004 American biographical musical drama film focusing on 30 years in the life of rhythm and blues musician Ray Charles. The independently produced film was co-produced and directed by Taylor Hackford, and written by James L. White from a story by Hackford and White. It stars Jamie Foxx in the title role, along with Kerry Washington, Clifton Powell, Harry Lennix, Terrence Howard, Larenz Tate, Richard Schiff and Regina King in supporting roles. Along with Hackford, the film was also produced by Stuart Benjamin, Howard Baldwin and Karen Baldwin.

It was released on October 29, 2004, by Universal Pictures. It received positive reviews from critics, with particular praise for Foxx's performance. It was also a commercial success, grossing $124.7 million worldwide against a production budget of $40 million.

Ray received many accolades and nominations and was nominated in six categories at the 77th Academy Awards. For his performance, Foxx won the Academy Award for Best Actor as well as the Golden Globe, BAFTA, Screen Actors Guild, and Critics' Choice, becoming the second actor to win all five major lead actor awards for the same performance, and the only one to win the Golden Globe in the Musical or Comedy category, rather than in Drama.

Charles had planned to attend a screening of the completed film but died of liver disease in June 2004, months prior to the premiere.

Plot

Ray Charles Robinson is raised in poverty in Florida by his mother, Aretha. Learning to play piano at an early age, Ray is haunted by the accidental death of his younger brother George, who drowns in their mother's washbasin. Ray loses his vision and by age seven is completely blind. Aretha teaches him to be independent, eventually sending him to a school for the deaf and blind.

In 1946, Ray joins a white country band and wears sunglasses to hide his damaged eyes. Two years later, he travels to Seattle and joins a nightclub band, though the club's owner demands sexual favors and controls his money and career. After discovering he is being exploited, Ray signs his own record deal and leaves the band. Touring on the Chitlin' Circuit as "Ray Charles", he is introduced to heroin.

Ray is discovered by Ahmet Ertegun of Atlantic Records and records his first hit with Ertegun's song "Mess Around". In Houston, Ray falls in love with Della Bea, a preacher's daughter. Though she and others are unhappy about Ray mixing gospel with his music, he marries Della and continues to gain fame with "I Got a Woman" and "Hallelujah I Love Her So".

A pregnant Della finds Ray’s drug kit and confronts him. They reconcile after the birth of their first child, but Ray begins an affair with singer Mary Anne Fisher. In 1956, as Ray's popularity grows, he hires a trio to become "The Raelettes" and immediately falls for lead singer Margie Hendrix. They begin their own affair, and a jealous Mary Anne leaves.

A few years later, when Ray's band finishes a set early and the club’s owner demands they play the remaining time, Ray performs "What'd I Say" on the spot. His popularity rises through the 1950s and he moves his family to Los Angeles but continues to use heroin, straining his relationships with Della and Margie. In 1960, he signs a better contract with ABC Records, negotiating to own his master tapes.

Ray continues to experiment with his music, writing such hits as "Georgia on My Mind". Margie reveals she is pregnant, and cuts off their affair when Ray demands she end the pregnancy. He writes "Hit the Road Jack" with a solo by Margie, who uses her newfound recognition to embark on a solo career, while Ray struggles with his addiction.

In 1961, Ray encounters civil rights protestors outside his concert in Augusta, Georgia. Deciding not to play at the segregated venue, he cancels the concert and is banned from playing in Georgia. After he allows black and white audience members to dance together onstage during a concert in Indianapolis, his hotel room is raided by police. His arrest for heroin possession is made public, to Della’s dismay, but his record label has the charges dismissed.

In St. Louis, Ray performs the country-influenced "I Can't Stop Loving You" and is impressed by announcer Joe Adams, who joins his tour. Ray moves his family to Beverly Hills, and learns that Margie has died of an overdose. Joe alienates Ray’s band and his longtime friend and manager Jeff Brown, whom Ray fires.

In 1965, Ray returns from a concert in Montreal and is again arrested for heroin possession. Dismissing his excuses, Della pleads with him to overcome his habit, and he is sentenced to drug rehabilitation. Suffering vivid nightmares during withdrawal, Ray has a vision of George and their mother, who chastises him for letting his addictions cripple him.

By 1979, Ray has permanently quit heroin and receives an official apology from the state of Georgia, which names "Georgia On My Mind" the official state song. Ray goes on to have a long and successful career as a world-famous entertainer until his death in 2004.

Cast

 Jamie Foxx as Ray Charles Robinson
 C. J. Sanders as Young Ray Robinson
 Kerry Washington as Della Bea Robinson
 Clifton Powell as Jeff Brown
 Aunjanue Ellis as Mary Ann Fisher
 Harry Lennix as Joe Adams
 Terrence Howard as Gossie McKee
 Larenz Tate as Quincy Jones
 Bokeem Woodbine as Fathead Newman
 Sharon Warren as Aretha Robinson
 Curtis Armstrong as Ahmet Ertegun of Atlantic Records
 Richard Schiff as Jerry Wexler
 Wendell Pierce as Wilbur Brassfield, manager
 Chris Thomas King as Lowell Fulson
 David Krumholtz as Milt Shaw
 Kurt Fuller as Sam Clark of ABC Records
 Warwick Davis as Oberon
 Patrick Bauchau as Dr. Hacker
 Robert Wisdom as Jack Lauderdale of Swing Time Records
 Denise Dowse as Marlene Andre
 Regina King as Margie Hendricks
 Rick Gomez as Tom Dowd

Production
The film's production was entirely financed by Philip Anschutz, through his Bristol Bay Productions company. Taylor Hackford said in a DVD bonus feature that it took 15 years to make the film; or more specifically, as he later clarified in the liner notes of the soundtrack album, this is how long it took him to secure the financing. It was made on a budget of $40 million.

Charles was given a Braille copy of the film's original script; he objected only to a scene showing him taking up piano grudgingly, and a scene implying that Charles had shown mistress and lead "Raelette" Margie Hendricks how to shoot heroin.

Denzel Washington was offered to play the title role, but he passed on the project. As stated in the DVD commentary, Foxx does not sing as Charles with exception to cover versions Charles performs in his earlier years. Kanye West and Ludacris have since made songs with Foxx singing as Charles in their songs "Gold Digger" and "Georgia", respectively.

Hackford stated in the DVD commentary that while Anschutz said the film would be made, he demanded that it be PG-13, and this caused him to walk away from the film five times. Because of Charles and Ahmet Ertegun asked him to make the movie, he agreed to do the film as a PG-13 rating.  The film was rated PG-13 for "depiction of drug addiction, sexuality and some thematic elements".

In the DVD commentary, Hackford stated that no studio was interested in backing the movie. After it was shot independently, Universal Pictures stepped in to distribute it. Part of the reason Universal Pictures released it was because one of its executives used to hitchhike to Ray Charles concerts.

The film's score was composed by Craig Armstrong. Ray debuted at the 2004 Toronto International Film Festival.

Soundtrack

Reception

Box office
Ray was released in theaters on October 29, 2004. The film went on to become a box-office hit, earning $75 million in the U.S. with an additional $50 million internationally, bringing its worldwide gross to $125 million.

Critical response
On Rotten Tomatoes, the film holds an approval rating of 80% based on 206 reviews, with an average rating of 7.30/10. The site's critical consensus reads, "An engrossing and energetic portrait of a great musician's achievements and foibles, Ray is anchored by Jamie Foxx's stunning performance as Ray Charles." On Metacritic the film has a weighted average score of 73 out of 100, based on 40 critics, indicating "generally favorable reviews". Audiences surveyed by CinemaScore gave the film a rare "A+" grade.

Roger Ebert of the Chicago Sun-Times wrote: "The movie would be worth seeing simply for the sound of the music and the sight of Jamie Foxx performing it. That it looks deeper and gives us a sense of the man himself is what makes it special." Ebert gave it a full 4 out of 4 stars. Richard Corliss of Time praised the cast, saying "If there were an Oscar for ensemble acting, Ray would win in a stroll." Peter Travers of Rolling Stone wrote: "Jamie Foxx gets so far inside the man and his music that he and Ray Charles seem to breathe as one."

According to music critic Robert Christgau, "Foxx does the impossible—radiates something approaching the charisma of the artist he's portraying... that's the only time an actor has ever brought a pop icon fully to life on-screen."

Awards

Related projects
In the wake of his performance as Charles in the film, Foxx featured on hip-hop songs that sampled Charles' songs:
 Georgia by Ludacris also featuring Field Mob, which samples Georgia on My Mind.
 Gold Digger by Kanye West, which samples I Got a Woman.

Differences from noted events
The film's credits state that Ray is based on true events, but includes some characters, names, locations, and events which have been changed and others which have been "fictionalized for dramatization purposes." Examples of the fictionalized scenes include:
 The film's portrayal of Charles' brother George's death in 1935 shows him drowning in a metal tub after Ray doesn't attempt to rescue him because he assumes he is just playing; Ray's mother then discovers George drowning when calling the boys in for dinner. Though George did drown in a metal tub, Ray did try to pull him out, but was unable to do so due to George's large body weight; Ray then ran inside to tell his mother what happened.
 Throughout the film, it is suggested that Ray's depression and heroin addiction were fueled by nervous breakdowns he had over the deaths of both George and his mother, as well as his blindness. In reality, the death of his mother did give him a nervous breakdown and was thought to be a leading cause of his depression, but the death of George and his blindness did not lead to nervous breakdowns.
 It is true that Charles kicked his heroin addiction after undergoing treatment in a psychiatric hospital during 1965, as stated towards the end of the film, but it is not mentioned that he would often use gin and marijuana as substitutes for heroin throughout much of the remaining years of his life.
 In the scene in which "What'd I Say" is being played, Charles is depicted as playing a Fender Rhodes electric piano, but in reality, he used a Wurlitzer electric piano on the original recording and began using it on tour in 1956, because he didn't trust the tuning and quality of the pianos provided to him at every venue.
 In the film, when his backing singer and mistress Margie Hendricks informs Ray she is pregnant with his child, Ray suggests she should have an abortion, out of loyalty to Della; Margie decides to keep the baby and soon leaves Ray to pursue a separate singing career after he refuses to abandon his family, move in with her and welcome the baby into his life. In reality, Hendricks did conceive a child with Charles and abandoned him after he refused to leave Della, but Charles never asked her to have an abortion, and welcomed any child he conceived, whether from Della or any mistress, into his personal life.
In the film Margie leaves the Raelettes in 1961, but in reality she was fired from the group by Ray in 1964 after a heated argument.
 In the scene in which Charles is about to enter a segregated music hall in Augusta, Georgia, in 1961, a group of civil rights activists protesting just outside the hall successfully persuade him not to perform; Charles then declares that he will no longer perform in segregated public facilities and in response, the Georgia state legislature passes a resolution banning Charles from ever performing again in the state. In reality, a group of civil rights activists did successfully persuade Charles to reject this invitation, but the advice came in the form of a telegram rather than a street protest; Charles also did make up for the gig later, and was never banned from performing in Georgia and still accepted invitations to perform at segregated public facilities.
 In the film, Margie Hendricks dies in 1964. However, in reality she died on July 14, 1973, but, no official cause of death was determined because an autopsy was not performed.
 During the final scene in the film, when Charles' version of "Georgia on My Mind" becomes Georgia's state song, Charles is congratulated by his wife Della, and a resolution is also passed to lift the lifetime ban he had received in 1961 after he declared he would no longer perform at segregated public facilities. In reality, by the time "Georgia on My Mind" became Georgia's state song in 1979, Charles and Della had already divorced, so she wasn't present when Charles performed at the Georgia State Legislature; and since he had never been banned from performing in Georgia in the first place, no such resolution was ever passed.

References

External links

 
 
 

2004 films
2004 biographical drama films
African-American musical films
African-American biographical dramas
African-American films
American biographical drama films
American independent films
American musical drama films
BAFTA winners (films)
Biographical films about musicians
Cultural depictions of jazz musicians
Cultural depictions of rock musicians
Cultural depictions of soul musicians
Films about blind people
Films about pianos and pianists
Films directed by Taylor Hackford
Films featuring a Best Actor Academy Award-winning performance
Films featuring a Best Musical or Comedy Actor Golden Globe winning performance
Films set in the 1930s
Films set in the 1940s
Films set in the 1950s
Films set in the 1960s
Films set in the 1970s
Films set in the 1980s
Films shot in New Orleans
Films that won the Best Sound Mixing Academy Award
Musical films based on actual events
Ray Charles
Universal Pictures films
Films about heroin addiction
Films scored by Craig Armstrong (composer)
2004 drama films
Blues films
2000s English-language films
2000s American films
Films about disability